A list of notable Czech male actors.

A
Josef Abrhám
Jiří Adamíra

B
Jiří Bartoška
Svatopluk Beneš
Ladislav Boháč
Vlastimil Brodský
Radoslav Brzobohatý
Jan Budař
Vlasta Burian

C
František Ringo Čech
Vladimír Čech
Petr Čepek

D
Martin Dejdar
Zdeněk Dítě
Vladimír Dlouhý
Miroslav Donutil
Jan Antonín Duchoslav
Rudolf Antonín Dvorský
Jiří Dvořák
Josef Dvořák
Vladimír Dvořák

E
Marek Eben

F
Eman Fiala
Ladislav Fialka
František Filipovský
Miloš Forman
Martin Frič
Ferenc Futurista

G
Jiří Grossmann

H
Hugo Haas
Tomáš Hanák
Petr Haničinec
František Hanus
Jan Hartl
Karel Hašler
Ondřej Havelka
Karel Heřmánek
Juraj Herz
Gustav Hilmar
Josef Hlinomaz
Jiří Holý
Felix Holzmann
Miroslav Horníček
Zdeněk Hruška
Jan Hrušínský
Rudolf Hrušínský
Matěj Hádek
Karel Höger
Daniel Hůlka

J
Petr Jákl
Ivan Jandl
Vladimír Javorský
Jan Jílek

K
Karel Kachyňa
Oldřich Kaiser
Josef Karlík
Josef Kemr
Gertan Klauber
Jiří Kodet
Eduard Kohout
Josef Jiří Kolár
Miloš Kopecký
Otomar Korbelář
Jiří Korn
Petr Kostka
Václav Kotva
Přemysl Kočí
Jiří Krampol
Jan Kraus
Karel Krautgartner
Otomar Krejča
Miroslav Krobot
Adolf Krössing

L
Jiří Lábus
Karel Lamač
Daniel Landa
Pavel Landovský
Lubomír Lipský
Václav Lohniský
Herbert Lom
Radovan Lukavský

M
Jiří Macháček
Miroslav Macháček
Jiří Mádl
Jaroslav Marvan
Tomáš Matonoha
Jiří Menzel
Vladimír Menšík
Martin Miller
Antonín Molčík
Miroslav Moravec
Jaroslav Moučka
Luděk Munzar

N
Oldřich Navrátil
Robert Nebřenský
Václav Neckář
Gustav Nezval
Oldřich Nový
Petr Nárožný

P
Ladislav Pešek
Theodor Pištěk
Jindřich Plachta
Jiří Pleskot
Bronislav Poloczek
Bolek Polívka
Jan Potměšil
George Pravda
Viktor Preiss
Antonín Procházka
Jaroslav Průcha

R
Čestmír Řanda
Filip Renč
Karel Roden
Zdeněk Rohlíček
Boris Rösner
Matouš Ruml
Břetislav Rychlík
Vladimír Ráž
Martin Růžek

S
Jaroslav Satoranský
Jan Schmid
Jiří Schmitzer
Miloslav Šimek
Otto Šimánek
Ota Sklenčka
Jan Skopeček
Jiří Šlitr
Viktor Skála
Čeněk Šlégl
Vladimír Šmeral
Ladislav Smoljak
František Smolík
Karel Smyczek
Luděk Sobota
Ondřej Sokol
Josef Somr
Jiří Sovák
Zdeněk Srstka
Milan Šteindler
Jan Nepomuk Štěpánek
Martin Štěpánek
Zdeněk Štěpánek
Jiří Strach
Martin Stropnický
Michal Suchánek
Jiří Suchý
Josef Šváb-Malostranský
Petr Svoboda
Petr Svojtka
Alois Švehlík
David Švehlík
Jan Svěrák
Zdeněk Svěrák

T
Marek Taclík
Lubor Tokoš
Ivan Trojan
Ondřej Trojan
Václav Trégl
Miroslav Táborský
Jan Tříska

V
Lukáš Vaculík
Marek Vašut
Karel Velebný
Oldřich Velen
Ondřej Vetchý
Josef Vinklář
Eduard Vojan
Jaroslav Vojta
Pavel Vondruška
Tomáš Vorel
Václav Voska
Jiří Voskovec
Jiří Vršťala
Ivan Vyskočil

W
Jan Werich

Z
Pavel Zedníček
Martin Zounar

 
Actors
Czech